The 2013 AFL season was the Port Adelaide Football Club's 17th season in the Australian Football League (AFL). The club was captained by Travis Boak and coached by Ken Hinkley.

Draft picks

Transactions

Overview

Trades

Free Agents

Subtractions

2013 Playing List

Pre-season results

Home and Away season

Games

Finals

Ladder

Ladder progress

Season statistics

Home attendance

Top 5 Goal Scorers

Awards

Brownlow Medal

John Cahill Medal

Other Awards

SANFL season

Results

Ladder

References

External links 

Port Adelaide Football Club
Port Adelaide Football Club seasons